Heliconia tortuosa is an herbaceous tropical perennial commonly found in secondary succession in montane forests in Central America and southern Mexico (Chiapas and Tabasco). It is moderately shade tolerant. It has also been widely cultivated as a garden plant for its showy, usually twisted (hence the name tortuosa) inflorescences.

Heliconia tortuosa is selective with its pollination, allowing only green hermit and violet sabrewing hummingbirds to pollinate its flowers.

References

External links
 Heliconia tortuosa observations on iNaturalist

tortuosa
Flora of Chiapas
Flora of Tabasco
Flora of Central America